Campen or Kampen may refer to:

Places

Finland 
 Kampen, the Swedish name of Kamppi, a district in Helsinki

Germany 
 Campen, Germany, a village by the Ems estuary, northwestern Germany, home of the Campen Lighthouse
 Campen Castle, a partially standing castle built in the late 13th century in Lehre, Lower Saxony
 Kampen (Sylt), a municipality on the island Sylt
 Kampen Lighthouse, a lighthouse on the island of Sylt
 Kampen (mountain), a mountain in Bavaria

Netherlands 
 Kampen, Friesland, a village in the municipality Súdwest-Fryslân
 Kampen, Overijssel, a municipality and town in the Netherlands
 Kampen railway station, a railway station in Kampen, Overijssel
 University of Kampen, a historic university in Kampen, Overijssel

Norway 
 Kampen, Norway, a neighborhood in the city of Oslo
 Kampen, Stavanger, a neighborhood in the city of Stavanger

People 
 Ranee Campen (born 1989), Thai actress
 Van Kampen, a list of people named Van Kampen
 Van Campen, a list of people named Van Campen

See also 
 Kampen Church (disambiguation)
 University of Kampen (disambiguation)